Aulophyseter is an extinct genus of sperm whales from the Miocene formations of the west and east coasts of North America.

Distribution 
Fossils of Aulophyseter have been found in:
 Oidawara Formation, Japan
 United States
 Temblor Formation, California
 St. Marys Formation, Maryland

See also 

 Evolution of cetaceans

References 

 Colbert's Evolution of the Vertebrates: A History of the Backboned Animals Through Time by Edwin H. Colbert, Michael Morales, and Eli C. Minkoff Pg.396.
 Sperm Whales: Social Evolution in the Ocean by Hal Whitehead  
 Encyclopedia of Marine Mammals by William F. Perrin, Bernd Wursig, and J. G.M. Thewissen
 Aulophyseter morricei

External links 
 Age of Mammals - Specimen Spotlight - Aulophyseter morricei

Sperm whales
Prehistoric toothed whales
Prehistoric cetacean genera
Miocene cetaceans
Miocene mammals of Asia
Neogene Japan
Fossils of Japan
Miocene mammals of North America
Neogene United States
Miocene mammals of South America
Montehermosan
Huayquerian
Neogene Argentina
Fossils of Argentina
Fossil taxa described in 1927